Sir Seretse Khama Barracks Stadium, popularly known as SSKB Stadium, is a multi-use stadium in Mogoditshane, Kweneng, Botswana. It is used mostly for football matches and serves as the home stadium of Botswana Defence Force XI. The stadium holds 5,000 people. The stadium is owned by the Botswana Defence Force (BDF). The pitch is encircled by an athletics track.

External links
Venue information

Football venues in Gaborone
Military of Botswana